Indecainide (INN, trade name Decabid) is a class Ic antiarrhythmic agent. Developed and marketed by Lilly, it has now been discontinued.

References

External links
 FDA drug details 

Antiarrhythmic agents
Fluorenes
Carboxamides